Phạm Hoàng Quỳnh (born 20 September 1992) is a Vietnamese footballer who plays as a midfielder for Women's Championship club Phong Phú Hà Nam. She has a member of the Vietnam women's national team.

International goals

References

1992 births
Living people
Women's association football midfielders
Vietnamese women's footballers
Vietnam women's international footballers
Asian Games competitors for Vietnam
Footballers at the 2014 Asian Games
Footballers at the 2018 Asian Games
Southeast Asian Games silver medalists for Vietnam
Southeast Asian Games medalists in football
Competitors at the 2013 Southeast Asian Games
21st-century Vietnamese women